Edgar Elbakyan (7 March 1928 - 31 August 1988) was an Armenian actor.

Biography 

Elbakyan was born in Tiflis in school-teacher family. In 1946, he graduated from secondary school, he moved to Yerevan and entered Yerevan State Academy of Art. He successfully graduated from the institute in 1950 and started his acting career in Yang Audience theater. He acted the part of many outstanding images of Russian, Armenian and foreign novels: Khlestakov -"The Government Inspector", Cardinal Richelieu-"The Three Musketeers".
In 1962, Edgar Elbakyan was invited to join the team of Sundukyan State Academic Theatre of Yerevan, and had successfully performed as : Giqo -"Pepo", Tarelkin "Lawsuit", Topaz -"Topaz".

His perfect and special manner to embody different genre roles had its separate niche in the history of Armenian and USSR theatre art.
His talent always was in focus of wide theatre audience and critics as well as art historians.
In 1978, he was awarded the highest title of USSR Culture - "National Artist". In 1979, he was awarded The State Prize.
Edgar Elbakyan was very well known, deeply loved and admired by several generations of theatre fans. His manner to perform the characters was unique, with special touch to unlock deep emotions, be them tragic, comedy or other.

Filmography 
1954 -Small Change (Manruq)
1963 - Fire (Krak) as Aramazd
1970 - At the Well (Jrhori mot) asBagdasar
1972 - (Txamardiq) as teller
1973 - Arshak (Arshak) as Arshak
1974 - Villagers (Hamagyaxaciner) Mirzoyan
1975 - When it comes September  (Erb galis e septembery) as Laertes
1976 - Baghdasar divorcing his wife (Bagdasary bajanvum e knojic)
1976 - Birth
1977 - Bow to bring the day (Khonarvir vaxva orvan)
1978 - Star of Hope - Phindz Artin

References

External links

Soviet male actors
Armenian male stage actors
Armenian male film actors
People's Artists of Armenia
1928 births
1988 deaths
Recipients of the USSR State Prize
Actors from Tbilisi
Soviet Armenians
Georgian people of Armenian descent
20th-century Armenian male actors